Potito Starace was the three-time defending champion, but he lost to Andreas Haider-Maurer in the first round.

Pablo Cuevas won in the final 6–1, 6–3, against Victor Crivoi.

Seeds

Draw

Finals

Top half

Bottom half

References
 Main Draw

Tennis Napoli Cup - Singles
2009 Singles